Ocean Front Property is the seventh studio album by American country music artist George Strait, released on January 12, 1987 by MCA Records. It is certified 2× Multi-platinum by the RIAA. It is the first album to debut at #1 on the Billboard Top Country Albums Chart. It was ranked #5 on CMT's list of 40 Greatest Albums in Country Music in 2006.

Track listing

Personnel
All tracks except "Hot Burning Flames" and "You Can't Buy Your Way out of the Blues"
Richard Bennett - acoustic guitar
Larry Byrom - electric guitar
Paul Franklin - steel guitar, dobro
Johnny Gimble - fiddle, mandolin
Owen Hale - drums
John Barlow Jarvis - piano
Leland Sklar - bass guitar
George Strait - lead vocals
Billy Joe Walker, Jr. - electric guitar
Curtis "Mr. Harmony" Young - background vocals
Reggie Young - electric guitar

The Ace in the Hole Band
on "Hot Burning Flames" and "You Can't Buy Your Way out of the Blues"
David Anthony - acoustic guitar
Mike Daily - steel guitar
Gene Elders - fiddle
Phillip Fajardo - drums
Terry Hale - bass guitar
Ronnie Huckaby - piano, synclavier
Benny McArthur - electric guitar, fiddle
Rick McRae - electric guitar
George Strait - lead vocals
Curtis "Mr. Harmony" Young - background vocals

Production
 Steve Tillisch – engineer
Willie Pevear – engineer
Chuck Ainlay – engineer
Tim Kish – engineer
Marty Williams – engineer
Jessie Noble – project coordinator
Simon Levy – art direction
Mickey Braitheaite – design
Jerry Smith – photography

Chart positions

Certifications

References

1987 albums
George Strait albums
MCA Records albums
Albums produced by Jimmy Bowen